Naim Nova (born 1 March 1940) is an Albanian actor, director and producer. Throughout his career he has created plays for local comedy theatres in Kavajë, Lushnje, Durrës and Tirana.

Filmography 

 Zevendesi i grave (1987)
 Duke kerkuar per 5-oreshin (1974)

References

Living people
Actors from Kavajë
1940 births